New Orleans, Louisiana, was the largest city in the South, providing military supplies and thousands of troops for the Confederate States Army. Its location near the mouth of the Mississippi made it a prime target for the Union, both for controlling the huge waterway and crippling the Confederacy’s vital cotton exports.

In April 1862, the West Gulf Blockading Squadron under Captain David Farragut shelled the two substantial forts guarding each of the river-banks, and forced a gap in the defensive boom placed between them. After running the last of the Confederate batteries, they took the surrender of the forts, and soon afterwards the city itself, without further action. The new military governor, Major General Benjamin Butler, proved effective in enforcing civic order, though his methods aroused protest everywhere. One citizen was hanged for tearing down the US flag, and any woman insulting a Federal soldier would be treated as a prostitute. Looting by troops was also rife, though apparently not with Butler’s approval. He was eventually replaced by Maj. Gen. Nathaniel P. Banks, who somewhat improved relations between troops and citizens, but military occupation had to continue well after the war.
 
The prompt surrender of the city had saved it from serious damage, so it remains notably well-preserved today.

Early war years
The early history of New Orleans was one of uninterrupted growth. In the 1850 census, New Orleans ranked as the 6th largest city in the United States, with a population reported as 168,675. It was the only city in the South with over 100,000 people. By 1840 New Orleans had the largest slave market in the nation, which contributed greatly to its wealth. During the antebellum years, two-thirds of the more than one million slaves who moved from the Upper South in forced migration to the Deep South were taken in the slave trade. Estimates are that the slaves generated an ancillary economy valued at 13.5 percent of the price per person, generating tens of billions of dollars through the years.

Antebellum New Orleans was the commercial heart of the Deep South, with cotton comprising fully half of the estimated $156,000,000 (in 1857 dollars) exports, followed by tobacco and sugar. Over half of all the cotton grown in the U.S. passed through the port of New Orleans (1.4 million bales), fully three times more than at the second-leading port of Mobile. The city also boasted a number of Federal buildings, including the New Orleans Mint, a branch of the United States Mint, and the U.S. Custom House.

Louisiana voted to secede from the Union on January 22, 1861. On January 29, the Secession Convention reconvened in New Orleans (it had earlier met in Baton Rouge) and passed an ordinance that allowed Federal employees to remain in their posts, but as employees of the state of Louisiana. In March, Louisiana ratified the Constitution of the Confederate States. The New Orleans Mint was seized; it was used during 1861 to produce Confederate coinage, particularly half-dollars. Since the dies were not changed, these are indistinguishable from 1861-O (the raised O indicating New Orleans) halves minted by the U.S. government. (Using a different reverse die, an unknown number of true Confederate half-dollars were minted, before the silver bullion ran out. See New Orleans Mint.)

New Orleans soon became a major source of troops, armament, and supplies to the Confederate States Army. Among the early responders to the call for troops was the "Washington Artillery," a pre-war militia artillery company that later formed the nucleus of a battalion in the Army of Northern Virginia. In January 1862, men from the free black community of New Orleans formed a regiment of Confederate soldiers called the Louisiana Native Guard. Although they were denied battle participation, the Confederates used the Guard to defend various entrenchments around New Orleans. Several area residents soon rose to prominence in the Confederate States Army, including P.G.T. Beauregard, Braxton Bragg, Albert G. Blanchard, and Harry T. Hays, the commander of the famed Louisiana Tigers infantry brigade which included a large contingent of Irish American New Orleanians.

The city was initially the site of a Confederate States Navy ordnance depot. New Orleans shipfitters produced some innovative warships, including the CSS Manassas (an early ironclad), as well as two submarines (the Bayou St. John submarine and the Pioneer) which did not see action before the fall of the city. The Confederate Navy actively defended the lower reaches of the Mississippi River, during the Battle of the Head of Passes.

Early in the Civil War, New Orleans became a prime target for the Union Army and Navy. The U.S. War Department planned a major attack to seize control of the city and its vital port, to choke off a major source of income and supplies for the fledgling Confederacy.

Fall of New Orleans

The political and commercial importance of New Orleans, as well as its strategic position, marked it out as the objective of a Union expedition soon after the opening of the Civil War. Captain David Farragut was selected by the Union government for the command of the West Gulf Blockading Squadron in January 1862. The four heavy ships of his squadron (none of them armored) were, with many difficulties, brought to the Gulf Coast and the Lower Mississippi River. Around them assembled nineteen smaller vessels (mostly gunboats) and a flotilla of twenty mortar boats under Commander David Dixon Porter.

The main defenses of the Mississippi River consisted of two permanent forts, Fort Jackson and Fort St. Philip, along with numerous small auxiliary fortifications. The two forts were of masonry and brick construction, armed with heavy rifled guns as well as smoothbores and located on either river bank to command long stretches of the river and the surrounding flats. In addition, the Confederates had some improvised ironclads and gunboats, large and small, but these were outnumbered and outgunned by the Union Navy fleet.

On April 16, after elaborate reconnaissance, the Union's fleet steamed into position below the forts and prepared for the Battle of Forts Jackson and St. Philip. On April 18, the mortar boats opened fire. Their shells fell with great accuracy, and although one of the boats was sunk by counter-fire and two more were disabled, Fort Jackson was seriously damaged. However, the defenses were by no means crippled, even after a second bombardment on April 19. A formidable obstacle to the advance of the Union main fleet was a boom between the forts, designed to detain vessels under close fire if they attempted to run past. Gunboats were repeatedly sent at night to endeavor to destroy the barrier, but they had little success. US Navy bombardment of the forts continued, disabling only a few Confederate guns. The gunners of Fort Jackson were under cover and limited in their ability to respond.

At last, on the night of April 23, the gunboats Pinola and Itasca ran in and opened a gap in the boom. At 2:00 a.m. on April 24, the fleet weighed anchor, Farragut in the corvette Hartford leading. After a severe conflict at close quarters with the forts and ironclads and fire rafts of the defense, almost all the Union fleet (except the mortar boats) forced its way past. The ships soon steamed upriver past the Chalmette batteries, the final significant Confederate defensive works protecting New Orleans from a sea-based attack.

At noon on April 25, Farragut anchored in front of the prized city. Forts Jackson and St. Philip, isolated and continuously bombarded by the mortar boats, surrendered on April 28. Soon afterwards, the infantry portion of the combined arms expedition marched into New Orleans and occupied the city without further resistance, resulting in the capture of New Orleans.

New Orleans had been captured without a battle in the city itself and so it was spared the destruction suffered by many other cities of the American South. It retains a historical flavor, with a wealth of 19th-century structures far beyond the early colonial city boundaries of the French Quarter.

The city was in Confederate hands for 455 days.

New Orleans under Union Army

The Federal commander, Major General Benjamin Butler, soon subjected New Orleans to a rigorous martial law so tactlessly administered as greatly to intensify the hostility of South and North. Many of his acts gave great offense, such as the seizure of $800,000 that had been deposited in the office of the Dutch consul. Butler was nicknamed "The Beast," or "Spoons Butler" (the latter arising from silverware looted from local homes by some Union troops, though there was no evidence that Butler himself was personally involved in such thievery). Butler ordered the inscription "The Union Must and Shall Be Preserved" to be carved into the base of the celebrated equestrian statue of General Andrew Jackson, the hero of the Battle of New Orleans, in Jackson Square.

Most notorious to city residents was Butler's General Order No. 28 of May 15, issued after some provocation: if any woman should insult or show contempt for any Federal officer or soldier, she shall be regarded and shall be held liable to be treated as a "woman of the town plying her avocation," a common prostitute. That order provoked storms of protests both in the North and the South as well as abroad, particularly in England and France.

Among Butler's other controversial acts was the June hanging of William Mumford, a pro-Confederacy man who had torn down the US flag over the New Orleans Mint, against Union orders. He also imprisoned a large number of uncooperative citizens. However, Butler's administration had benefits to the city, which was kept both orderly and his massive cleanup efforts made it unusually healthy by 19th century standards. However, the international furor over Butler's acts helped fuel his removal from command of the Department of the Gulf on December 17, 1862.

Maj. Gen. Nathaniel P. Banks later assumed command at New Orleans. Under Banks, relationships between the troops and citizens improved, but the scars left by Butler's regime lingered for decades. Federal troops continued to occupy the city well after the war through the early part of Reconstruction.

Civil War heritage

A number of significant structures and buildings associated with the Civil War still stand in New Orleans, and vestiges of the city's defenses are evident downriver, as well as upriver at Camp Parapet.

On Camp Street, Louisiana's Civil War Museum at Confederate Memorial Hall Museum, founded in 1891 by war veterans, boasts the second-largest collection of Confederate military artifacts in the country, after Richmond's Museum of the Confederacy.

Notable New Orleans people of the Confederate military
P.G.T. Beauregard, Confederate general and inventor
Judah P. Benjamin, United States Senator, Confederate Attorney General, Secretary of War and Secretary of State
Albert G. Blanchard, Confederate general
Harry T. Hays, Confederate general

Notes
Abbreviations used in these notes
Official atlas: Atlas to accompany the official records of the Union and Confederate armies.
ORA (Official records, armies): War of the Rebellion: a compilation of the official records of the Union and Confederate Armies.
ORN (Official records, navies): Official records of the Union and Confederate Navies in the War of the Rebellion.

References

External links

New Orleans Civil War photo album
Confederate Memorial Hall museum
"The Washington Artillery, 5th Company, at the Battle of Perryville"—Article by Civil War historian/author Bryan S. Bush
Online exhibit about the Civil War at Louisiana State Museum

Further reading
Grace King: New Orleans, the Place and the People (1895)
Henry Rightor: Standard History of New Orleans (1900)
John Smith Kendall: History of New Orleans (1922)
 Clara Solomon and Elliott Ashkenazi (ed.), The Civil War diary of Clara Solomon : Growing up in New Orleans, 1861-1862. Baton Rouge : Louisiana State University Press (1995) .
 Jean-Charles Houzeau, My Passage at the New Orleans Tribune: A Memoir of the Civil War Era. Louisiana State University Press (2001) .
 Albert Gaius Hills and Gary L. Dyson (ed.), "A Civil War Correspondent in New Orleans, the Journals and Reports of Albert Gaius Hills of the Boston Journal." McFarland and Company, Inc.(2013) .

Louisiana in the American Civil War
New Orleans
19th century in New Orleans